Index is a town in Snohomish County, Washington, United States. The population was 178 at the 2010 census.

History

Prior to settlement by white Americans, the Skykomish lived in the area between Sultan and Index. The Skykomish had a village along the north bank of the river named , located at the present site of Index.

Logging and lumber booms in the latter half of the 19th century led to the growth of minor settlements in the eastern part of what became Snohomish County in 1861. 
A gold strike in 1889 at nearby Monte Cristo fueled another influx of prospectors and settlers. Index was founded in 1889 on the homestead of Amos Gunn, whose home was also a hotel for prospectors and surveyors. The town was named for nearby Mount Index (later renamed Baring Mountain), itself named for its resemblance to an index finger. The settlement gained a post office in 1891 and saw major growth after the arrival of the Great Northern Railway. Gunn filed his town plat for Index on April 25, 1893, three months before a major fire on July 22 destroyed most of its buildings.

Index was officially incorporated on October 11, 1907. Its population peaked during the decade at 1,000 and has since declined to 200. The Index area had few jobs and services, with only a single restaurant and general store by the 1980s to serve a population of around 150.

The Snohomish County Public Utility District had planned to build a hydroelectric power plant at Sunset Falls near Index in the early 2010s, but abandoned the project after it was opposed by environmentalists and local residents.

Index and neighboring areas were placed under mandatory evacuation orders on September 10, 2022, due to the nearby Bolt Creek Fire. The order was modified two days later to allow residents to return to their homes, but U.S. Route 2 remained closed to most travel.

Geography
These walls are popularly used for rock climbing, offering a variety of high-quality cracks for this purpose.

Index is located on the North Fork Skykomish River, just above its confluence with the main channel of the Skykomish River. In December 1980, the Skykomish River flooded the town and destroyed eight homes.

The BNSF railroad, formerly the Great Northern Railway, runs through the middle of the town. Index was once an important stop for the mining (particularly Monte Cristo and Galena) and timber activities north of its location.

Demographics

Index has a small population of around 200 permanent residents, many of whom are retirees or work locally, alongside seasonal residents living in vacation homes. The town's population has declined since its peak in the 1890s of 1,000 residents.

2010 census

As of the 2010 U.S. census, there were 178 people, 80 households, and 44 families living in the town. The racial makeup of the town was 95.5% White, 1.7% Asian, 0.6% Pacific Islander, 0.6% from other races, and 1.7% from two or more races. Hispanic or Latino of any race were 4.5% of the population.

There were 80 households, of which 26.3% had children under the age of 18 living with them, 41.3% were married couples living together, 12.5% had a female householder with no husband present, 1.3% had a male householder with no wife present, and 45.0% were non-families. 41.3% of all households were made up of individuals, and 12.5% had someone living alone who was 65 years of age or older. The average household size was 2.23 and the average family size was 3.02.

The median age in the town was 42 years. 22.5% of residents were under the age of 18; 5.6% were between the ages of 18 and 24; 24.1% were from 25 to 44; 35.5% were from 45 to 64; and 12.4% were 65 years of age or older. The gender makeup of the town was 47.2% male and 52.8% female.

2000 census

As of the 2000 census, there were 157 people, 75 households, and 39 families living in the town. The population density was 620.3 people per square mile (242.5/km2). There were 100 housing units at an average density of 395.1 per square mile (154.4/km2). The racial makeup of the town was 95.54% White, 1.27% Native American, 1.27% Asian, and 1.91% from two or more races. Hispanic or Latino of any race were 1.91% of the population.

As of the 2000 census, there were 75 households, out of which 30.7% had children under the age of 18 living with them, 34.7% were married couples living together, 10.7% had a female householder with no husband present, and 48.0% were non-families. 36.0% of all households were made up of individuals, and 5.3% had someone living alone who was 65 years of age or older. The average household size was 2.09, and the average family size was 2.67.

In the town, the population was spread out, with 22.3% under the age of 18, 3.2% from 18 to 24, 29.9% from 25 to 44, 37.6% from 45 to 64, and 7.0% who were 65 years of age or older. The median age was 43 years. For every 100 females, there were 103.9 males. For every 100 females age 18 and over, there were 110.3 males.

The median income for a household in the town was $43,125, and the median income for a family was $32,000. Males had a median income of $32,500 versus $13,750 for females. The per capita income for the town was $22,023. About 17.5% of families and 16.9% of the population were below the poverty line, including 29.3% of those under the age of 18 and none of those 65 or over.

Economy

The local economy has switched from extraction industries to tourism. Paradise Sound maintains a recording studio called Studio X where Jerry Cantrell and The Walkabouts have recorded albums.

Government and politics

Index is an incorporated town with a mayor–council form of government. The mayor and five-member town council are elected to four-year terms by registered residents. Index's government has three employed positions: a clerk for day-to-day management, a maintenance person, and a water distribution manager to oversee the water supply. The town contracts with the county government to provide additional services.

Culture

For many years, the Red Men Hall fraternal lodge, the largest building in town, served as the center for social life. It collapsed in 2009 after a severe snowstorm and was subsequently demolished. Another historic building in Index, the Bush House, was named an endangered landmark by the Washington Trust for Historic Preservation.

Education

The Index School District serves the town and surrounding areas in the southeast corner of Snohomish County. It has a single combined elementary–middle school with an enrollment of 28 students and three full-time teachers . The school building was constructed in the early 1950s, replacing an earlier high school and separate middle and elementary schools, and renovated in 2019. Since the closure of Index's lone high school in 1955, students are bused to Sultan High School.

Infrastructure

Transportation

The town is connected to US 2 by Index–Galena Road, which continues northeast into the Wild Sky Wilderness, although a flood in November 2006 washed out a section and has not been repaired.

The town's road bridge over the Skykomish River North Fork was built in 1922 and rehabilitated in 1981. It was replaced by a new bridge in 1999.

References

External links

 History of Index at HistoryLink

Towns in Washington (state)
Towns in Snohomish County, Washington